Jack Roscamp (8 August 1901 – 1939) was an English footballer, renowned for his physical style of play. He played for Blackburn Rovers, for whom he scored twice in the 1928 FA Cup Final, Bradford City and Shrewsbury Town, who he also went on to manage. He left Town, citing disagreements with their committee, and took up business as a publican, running The Boot Inn at Welshpool.

Honours
Blackburn Rovers
FA Cup: 1927–28

References

1901 births
1939 deaths
English footballers
Blackburn Rovers F.C. players
Bradford City A.F.C. players
Shrewsbury Town F.C. players
People from Blaydon-on-Tyne
Footballers from Tyne and Wear
Association football defenders
Association football forwards
FA Cup Final players